Colm Coyle (born 26 February 1963), is a former Gaelic footballer and former manager from County Meath, Ireland.  He was manager of the senior Meath county team from September 2006 to July 2008, having previously played for the county.

Playing career
Coyle won a Leinster Minor Football Championship medal with Meath in 1980. He made his senior debut for Meath in the 1981/82 National League. He enjoyed much success play inter-county football in the eighty's & ninety's on the Meath teams managed by Sean Boylan.

He was part of the Meath team which won the Leinster Championship in 1986, Meath's first since 1970. Coyle then emigrated to America thus being unavailable for Meath's successful Leinster championship defense in 1987. He returned to Ireland prior the All-Ireland semi-final and was a substitute as Meath won their first All-Ireland title in 1987 for twenty years. In 1988, when Meath retained the All-Ireland Colm played as a Half back in the All-Ireland final replay.

In 1996, he won his third All-Ireland medal. In the final that year his late effort at a point fell short of the goals but after bouncing went over the bar for a point to earn Meath a replay. Early in that replay Coyle was sent off for his involvement in melee in which almost all players from both teams were involved. Meath went on to win.

For Meath he played at various times in the full back line, half back line, half forward line & full forward line. He played club football for Seneschalstown. During his playing career he won three All-Ireland Senior Football Championship medals (1987, 1988 & 1996), as well as five Leinster Senior Football Championship medals.

Managerial career
Eamonn Barry became coach of the Meath football team for 2006, as successor to the long-time manager Sean Boylan. However, Meath did not perform well in the 2006 All-Ireland Senior Football Championship. The County Board accordingly appointed Coyle in his place on 11 September 2006, with Tommy Dowd and Dudley Farrell as selectors. Barry's response was 'I'm not a bit surprised. I've been well aware of the situation for the past couple of months'.

Coyle's reign started well, as Meath enjoyed success in the Championship. They were knocked out of the Leinster Championship by eventual champions Dublin. However, they went on to reach the 2007 All-Ireland Senior Football Championship quarter-final through the Qualifiers, and notched up a notable victory over 2003 and 2005 champions Tyrone, who had won the Ulster Senior Football Championship. Cork beat Meath in the semi-final by 1–16 to 0–9 in a game attended by only 38,000 people, but Coyle's team were regarded as having had a good year overall.

Meath beat Carlow by 20 points in an impressive start to the 2008 championship. However, they were knocked out of the Leinster Senior Football Championship by Wexford. An emphatic defeat against Limerick followed, and Coyle resigned.
On 10 November 2008, Eamonn O'Brien, one of Sean Boylan's selectors, was confirmed as the new Meath football boss after a meeting with the county board.

References
  Article on Hoganstand.com

1965 births
Living people
Gaelic football managers
Meath inter-county Gaelic footballers
Seneschalstown Gaelic footballers
Winners of three All-Ireland medals (Gaelic football)